Now Hear This is a 1962 Warner Bros. Looney Tunes cartoon directed by Chuck Jones and Maurice Noble, and written by Jones and John Dunn. The short was released on April 27, 1962. It was nominated for the Academy Award for Best Animated Short Film the following year.

Background 
The title comes from a phrase used aboard American naval ships as an instruction to cease activity and listen to the announcement that will follow.

Later, Jones described the film as "another picture I didn't understand," saying, "We kind of went out into — I don't know if it was left field; it was somewhere else I didn't understand. Jack Warner wasn't the only one who didn't understand that picture. I called it 'Chuck's Revenge', because it was one of the last pictures I made, and I was trying to find some way of infuriating him."

This cartoon resembles a UPA cartoon (whose cartoons had used limited animation techniques) more than a typical Warner Bros. short of the time.

Plot 
Satan, the Head Devil, loses his left horn, which is found by an elderly man in Britain (there are clues to the cartoon's location; a bin says "Keep Britain Tidy" and Rule Britannia is heard twice) who uses it as a hearing trumpet. Soon the man experiences a series of aural and visual hallucinations: A bug sounds like a locomotive; a butterfly causes him to see strange patterns; a short man in a pink suit makes mischief, at one point pulling a telephone from the horn and turning the phone's mouthpiece into a shower outlet. These hallucinations become steadily more strange and frightening before finally culminating in a "GIGANTIC EXPLOSION!" Having suffered enough, the gentleman leaves the horn behind in favor of his original ear trumpet, which he had thrown out at the cartoon's beginning. After he leaves, Satan materializes and is glad to find his missing horn; he screws it back on and disappears. The cartoon ends with the moral: "The other fellow's trumpet always looks greener".

Crew 
 Directed by Chuck Jones
 Co-Director & Layouts: Maurice Noble
 Story: John Dunn & Chuck Jones
 Animation: Ben Washam & Bob Bransford
 Backgrounds: Philip DeGuard
 Vocal Effects: Mel Blanc
 Music: Bill Lava
 Sound Effects Created by Treg Brown
 Produced by David H. DePatie

Title sequence 
This was the first Warner Bros. cartoon short to use the "modern" abstract opening and closing sequences, which would be used on all mid-1960s WB shorts, mainly produced by DePatie–Freleng Enterprises and Warner Bros.-Seven Arts Animation. This is also one of the rare Looney Tunes shorts to list the director's name first.

At the close of the cartoon, when the "modern" close is in progress, they have the first four notes of the Westminster Quarters play to bring on the four elements of the "WB" lettering, then as the words "A Warner Bros. CartOOn" scroll appear, Big Ben chimes, and then as the OO's in Cartoon separate from the words to give the impression of becoming eyes, a bicycle horn is heard squeaking three times. Big Ben gives one more chime as the words finish appearing on the screen before the fadeout. This closing sequence is seen in two more cartoons: Bartholomew Versus the Wheel and Señorella and the Glass Huarache. An updated variant was used on DFE-produced cartoons until the W7 era, except instead of Big Ben's chimes and the honks, a reprise of Bill Lava's version of "The Merry-Go-Round Broke Down" is heard (with the OO eyes occasionally separating twice instead of three times), and (with the exception of Pancho's Hideaway) instead of the background being white, the background is black.

The sequence was the idea of Chuck Jones; however, he was fired before he moved on to MGM Animation/Visual Arts due to participating in an animated production by United Productions of America, Gay Purr-ee (the film was later picked up by Warner for distribution), and he couldn't direct any more cartoons with this opening.

Home media 
Now Hear This is available on Warner Bros. Home Entertainment Academy Awards Animation Collection, Disc 3, on Looney Tunes Golden Collection: Volume 6, Disc 4 and on Warner Bros. Home Entertainment Academy Award-Nominated Animation: Golden Gems.

References

External links 
 
 

1962 films
1962 animated films
1962 short films
1960s American animated films
1960s Warner Bros. animated short films
Looney Tunes shorts
Animated films without speech
Short films directed by Chuck Jones
American avant-garde and experimental films
Films directed by Maurice Noble
Films scored by William Lava
The Devil in film
1960s English-language films
Films set in the United Kingdom
1960s avant-garde and experimental films